Burghofspiele Voitsberg is a theatre group in Austria.

Theatres in Austria
Buildings and structures in Styria